José Fernando da Silva Pinto (born 12 September 1968), commonly known as Zé Nando, is a Portuguese retired footballer who played as a left back.

Club career
In his extensive career, Penafiel-born Zé Nando played for hometown's F.C. Penafiel (his first and his last club, where he started professionally in 1994), Leça F.C. (1998–99), Gil Vicente F.C. (1999–2000), F.C. Paços de Ferreira (2000–04) and Vitória de Guimarães (2004–05).

Additionally, he played three years in Cyprus with AEK Larnaca FC (2005–07) and AEL Limassol (2007–08), and amassed Primeira Liga totals of 128 games and two goals, both scored for Paços. He retired from football in June 2010 at the age of 35, continuing to work with Penafiel as a coach.

External links
 
 
 

1975 births
Living people
People from Penafiel
Portuguese footballers
Association football defenders
Primeira Liga players
Liga Portugal 2 players
Segunda Divisão players
F.C. Penafiel players
Leça F.C. players
Gil Vicente F.C. players
F.C. Paços de Ferreira players
Vitória S.C. players
Cypriot First Division players
AEK Larnaca FC players
AEL Limassol players
Portuguese expatriate footballers
Expatriate footballers in Cyprus
Portuguese expatriate sportspeople in Cyprus
Sportspeople from Porto District